Grays Flat may refer to:

Grays Flat, California
Grays Flat, West Virginia